Ant Broads & Marshes NNR is a national nature reserve in Norfolk, England established by English Nature. It is named after the River Ant.

It is part of the "Ant Broads and Marshes" Site of Special Scientific Interest and is within The Broads National Park.

The NNR includes:
Barton Broad and Catfield Fen, owned and managed by Norfolk Wildlife Trust
Catfield Fen Reserve, owned and managed by the British Butterfly Conservation Society.

The fen is the best example of unpolluted valley fen in Western Europe.

See also
For National Nature Reserves in England
National nature reserves in England

For National Nature Reserves in Norfolk
National nature reserves in Norfolk

References

Nature reserves in Norfolk
National nature reserves in England
Norfolk Broads